Mohamed Bouchaïb (Arabic: محمد بوشعيب) (Benghazi, 17 July 1984) is an Libya-born and Algerian actor.

He is best known for his role in Mascarades (Arabic:مسخرة) directed by Lyes Salem (Arabic:إلياس سالم).  Bouchaïb won the Lumières Award for Most Promising Actor for his work in Mascarades.

Life and career
Mohamed Bouchaïb met Biyouna and :fr:Salah Aougrout when he was 19 years old, providing the introduction to a role in the popular Algerian TV sitcom Nass Mlah City (Arabic:ناس ملاح) directed by Djafaar Gassem.

Filmography

Film
 Mascarades (2007) film
 Le Dernier Passager (2009) 7 minutes - main role - directed Mounès Khemar 2010 was awarded at Cannes Film Festival, and participated in the 14th Guanajuato film festival. 
 La cité des Vieux (2010) 30 minutes - main role - directed Yahia Mouzaheme

TV
 Zraa' Yenbet (2005) 
 El Fhama (2005-2007) Canal Algérie
 Djemai Family 1 (2008) 
 Djemai Family 2 (2009)
 Nass Mlah City (2005/6) Canal Algérie
 Saad El Gat 1 (2010) Canal Algérie
 Saad El Gat 2 (2011) 
 Djemai Family 3 (2011) Canal Algérie

Awards and nomination
 2009: Lumières Award for Most Promising Actor for Mascarades

References

External links

Algerian male film actors
Living people
1984 births
People from Benghazi
Algerian male television actors
21st-century Algerian male actors
Most Promising Actor Lumières Award winners